Guðmundur "Gudi" Þórarinsson (born 15 April 1992) is an Icelandic professional footballer who plays as a midfielder for Super League Greece club OFI. He is also a well known singer in his homeland Iceland.

Club career
On 28 January 2020, Guðmundur joined Major League Soccer side New York City FC on a free transfer from Swedish first division club IFK Norrköping. Following the 2021 season, New York City opted to decline their contract option on Þórarinsson.

Career statistics

Club

International

Honours

Club

 Selfoss 
1. deild: 2009
 Rosenborg 
Norwegian League: 2016
Norwegian Football Cup: 2016
 New York City FC
 MLS Cup: 2021

Music career
Guðmundur is known as a good singer, and is the brother of Icelandic singer Ingó Veðurguð. In 2018 he entered the yearly edition of Söngvakeppnin, a preliminary competition to choose Iceland's representative for the Eurovision Song Contest 2018. He is also part of a New York-based band named Maybe Jesse.

References

External links
 Guðmundur Þórarinsson on FC Nordsjælland 
 

Living people
1992 births
Gudmundur Thorarinsson
Gudmundur Thorarinsson
Gudmundur Thorarinsson
Gudmundur Thorarinsson
Association football midfielders
Rosenborg BK players
FC Nordsjælland players
Sarpsborg 08 FF players
IFK Norrköping players
New York City FC players
AaB Fodbold players
OFI Crete F.C. players
Gudmundur Thorarinsson
Gudmundur Thorarinsson
Eliteserien players
Danish Superliga players
Major League Soccer players
Allsvenskan players
Super League Greece players
Gudmundur Thorarinsson
Gudmundur Thorarinsson
Expatriate footballers in Norway
Gudmundur Thorarinsson
Gudmundur Thorarinsson
Expatriate men's footballers in Denmark
Gudmundur Thorarinsson
Expatriate footballers in Sweden
Gudmundur Thorarinsson
Expatriate footballers in Greece
Gudmundur Thorarinsson
Expatriate soccer players in the United States